The Lance Rocks are two rocks lying together at the northeast end of Crouse Spur in the Forrestal Range, Pensacola Mountains, Antarctica. They were mapped by the United States Geological Survey from surveys and U.S. Navy air photos, 1956–66, and were named by the Advisory Committee on Antarctic Names for Captain Samuel J. Lance, United States Air Force, navigator and member of the Electronic Test Unit in the Pensacola Mountains, 1957–58.

References

Rock formations of Queen Elizabeth Land